Scaletta Zanclea is a comune (municipality) in the Metropolitan City of Messina in the Italian region Sicily, located about  east of Palermo and about  southwest of Messina.

The comune suffered heavily in the mudslides which devastated the area in 2009.

References

Cities and towns in Sicily